The Sugar Hill Greenway is a  multi-use trail under construction in and around the city of Sugar Hill, Georgia, in the United States.

The first phase of this project will be connecting the city’s downtown with the two parks on Level Creek and Peachtree Industrial Boulevard along with some new stops on Level Creek Road and Whitehead Road is in the final stages of design.

On February 27, 2018, the greenway was designated as one of the signature trails of Gwinnett County.

Objectives
The greenway project of this size and scale will be transformative for Sugar Hill. Specifically, the city and its residents can expect to experience economic, health, environmental, transportation, and community benefits from the greenway’s development.

History
According to the City of Sugar Hill, there has been a project timeline with details of the construction process.

2016
April 2016

Sugar Hill Greenway Project, The preliminary report for the Sugar Hill Greenway trail has been reviewed and the final report is being prepared by the City’s consultant. The 16-mile loop through some of the picturesque open spaces in and around Sugar Hill is now the subject of some discussions with GDOT, ARC, and other agencies as staff looks to identify funding for future phases of project development.

May 2016

Sugar Hill Greenway Project.  The preliminary report for the Sugar Loop Greenway Trail was presented at the Work Session last week and the final report is becoming a large part of our marketing and negotiations with prospective partners on the initiative.  The 16-mile loop through some of the more picturesque open spaces in and around Sugar Hill is now the subject of some discussions with GDOT, ARC, and other agencies as staff looks to identify funding for future phases of project development.

2017
March 2017

Sugar Hill Greenway Project, Phase I.  The project is now moving into full-scale data development with the surveying getting underway this month.  The first phase of this project will connect the city’s downtown with the two parks on Level Creek and Peachtree Industrial Boulevard along with some new stops on Level Creek Road and Whitehead Road in the planning stages.  The nearly five-mile route is programmed for construction to begin later this year and is attracting interest and support from the friends of the greenway group.  A site walk has been scheduled for April 11 at 5 o’clock to allow the Friends of the Greenway group to visit a portion of the route and get acquainted with the design considerations, challenges, and participate in the layout process.

May 2017

Sugar Hill Greenway Project, Phase I. The first phase of this project connecting the city’s downtown with the two parks on Level Creek and Peachtree Industrial Boulevard along with some new stops on Level Creek Road and Whitehead Road is in the surveying stage as we have been coordinating access with a large number of land owners, state, and local agencies. The Friends of the Greenway group held a site walk on April 11 which allowed them to get acquainted with the design considerations, challenges, and participate in the layout process. While we make progress on the design, the goal is to have the first phase under construction later this summer.

August 2017

Sugar Hill Greenway Project, Phase I. The first phase of this project connecting the city’s downtown with the two parks on Level Creek and Peachtree Industrial Boulevard along with some new stops on Level Creek Road and Whitehead Road is in the final stages of design. Permit plans are being assembled to begin the review process by GDOT and Gwinnett County for portions of the project passing through those entities.

Four sub-committees were formed to increase awareness of the project. They consist of: running, cycling, logistics and communications.

October 2017

Sugar Hill Greenway Project, Phase I. The project is moving into utility coordination and right-of-way acquisition as the design nears its conclusion. We expect to get right-of-way and easement documents soon to begin this phase of the project while we also resolve a few minor conflicts with driveways and alignment challenges. The Friends of the Greenway have met a couple of times this summer and fall to stay engaged in the project and build momentum going into the construction phase of the project.

December 2017

Sugar Hill Greenway Project, Phase I. The project is in the late stages of preliminary plans with right-of-way acquisition in process currently. The coordination with GDOT, utility and property owners is also underway. Some adjustments to the alignment are being considered to make the grades work and to respond to public input along the way. The layout along Level Creek Road has been staked to facilitate coordination during the acquisition process.

2018
January 2018

Sugar Hill Greenway Project, Phase I. A Friends of the Greenway meeting has been scheduled for January 29 to update the group on the project as well as to present planning information on countywide trails by Commissioner Lynette Howard. The meeting is scheduled for 6 PM in the History Museum Room on the first floor at City Hall.

February 2018

Sugar Hill Greenway Project, Phase I. The Friends of the Greenway met on January 29 and were treated to a presentation by Commissioner Lynette Howard on the countywide trails plan currently in the final stages of development. Construction plans are nearing completion on 80% of the length of the phase 1 route while one key segment is experiencing slight delays connecting Peachtree Industrial with Level Creek Road.

March 2018

Sugar Hill Greenway Project, Phase I. The project is in the final construction documents stage and right-of-way acquisition continues. There are some 26 parcels required in phase 1 of the project and discussions are ongoing with the owners to provide clearance for the proposed trail. The first event associated with opening the greenway will be later next month leading up to earth day activities along the segment on Peachtree Industrial Boulevard.

Funding
Funding source consist of a combination of federal, state and local.

According to the AJC, total capital improvements for the city of Sugar Hill's FY2018 are at $7,196,717. Most of the funding is dedicated to the start of the Sugar Hill Greenway, sidewalk improvements along Suwanee Dam Road, Whitehead Road and Sycamore Road, transportation improvements as well as improvements to the historic downtown Sugar Hill Cemetery.

See also
Cycling infrastructure
10-Minute Walk
Smart growth
Walkability

References

External links
Sugar Hill Greenway

Bike paths in Georgia (U.S. state)
Transportation in Gwinnett County, Georgia
Tourist attractions in Gwinnett County, Georgia